Gelatinipulvinella is a genus of fungi within the Leotiaceae family. This is a monotypic genus, containing the single species Gelatinipulvinella astraeicola.

References

External links
Index Fungorum

Helotiales
Monotypic Leotiomycetes genera